Ireland competed at the 2022 Winter Olympics in Beijing, China, from 4 to 20 February 2022.

On January 24, 2022, the Irish team of six athletes (four men and two women) competing in five sports was named. Elsa Desmond and Brendan Newby were the country's flagbearer during the opening ceremony.
All members of the team are members of the Irish diaspora, who were born or live and train elsewhere. Ireland won no medals; the best finish was Jack Gower in the men's combined alpine skiing, who finished 12th. Meanwhile cross-country skier Thomas Hjalmar Westgård was the flagbearer during the closing ceremony.

Competitors
The following is the list of number of competitors participating at the Games per sport/discipline.

Alpine skiing

By meeting the basic qualification standards Ireland qualified one male and one female alpine skier.

Cross-country skiing

Ireland qualified three male cross-country skiers but chose to only use one quota.

Distance

Freestyle skiing

Ireland qualified one male freestyle skier.
Halfpipe

Luge

Based on the results during the 2021–22 Luge World Cup season, Ireland qualified 1 sled in the women's singles. Elsa Desmond became the first luger to represent Ireland at the Olympics.

Snowboarding

Freestyle

References

Nations at the 2022 Winter Olympics
2022 Winter Olympics
Winter Olympics